Rhytida otagoensis is a species of small, air-breathing land snail, a terrestrial pulmonate gastropod mollusc in the family Rhytididae.

References

 Powell A W B, New Zealand Mollusca, William Collins Publishers Ltd, Auckland, New Zealand 1979 

Gastropods of New Zealand
Rhytida
Gastropods described in 1930
Endemic fauna of New Zealand
Endemic molluscs of New Zealand
Taxa named by Arthur William Baden Powell